(English: Universal Free Encyclopedia in Spanish) is a Spanish-language wiki-based online encyclopedia, released under the Creative Commons Attribution-ShareAlike License 3.0. It uses the MediaWiki software. It started as a fork of the Spanish Wikipedia.

History
The  was founded by contributors to the Spanish Wikipedia who decided to start an independent project. Led by Edgar Enyedy, they left Wikipedia on 26 February 2002, and created the new website, provided by the University of Seville for free, with the freely licensed articles of the Spanish Wikipedia.

The reasons for the split are explained on Enciclopedia Libre. Key issues included concerns about censorship and the possibility of advertising on Wikipedia. Edgar Enyedy stated the main reasons for splitting at that time as:
 Perceived expectation that Wikipedia would soon start hosting advertisements.
 Non-English Wikipedias were running older versions of MediaWiki. 
 When national groups offered help in software development and maintenance, access to theservers was denied.
 The downloadable database dumps of Wikipedia content were highly outdated.
 Wikipedia was hosted on a .com rather than a .org domain.

Post-split history
It was merely a form of pressure. Some of the goals were achieved, not all of them, but it was worth the cost." He further said "Nowadays, the romantic point of view is that EL survived and is still going strong." He argued that while the viewpoint is positive, it is not factual.

Statistics

While  initially grew much more rapidly than the Spanish Wikipedia, the Spanish Wikipedia overtook it in 2004. Since then, the Spanish Wikipedia has grown at a much greater rate. As of December 2016, the Spanish Wikipedia hosts approximately twenty-six times as many articles as Enciclopedia Libre.

See also

Susning.nu (Former Swedish wiki)
Baidu Baike (Chinese wiki)
List of online encyclopedias

References

External links

 
Old website 
EL Taller — fork of Enciclopedia Libre 
 Alvarez, Carlos "Enciclopedias en Internet". El País. 29 December 2005. 

History of Wikipedia
MediaWiki websites
Spanish online encyclopedias
Wiki communities
Internet properties established in 2002
Spanish-language websites
2002 establishments in Spain
University of Seville
21st-century encyclopedias
Wikipedia controversies